The 2016 Houston Dynamo season was the club's 11th season of existence since joining Major League Soccer for the 2006 season.

The Dynamo entered the 2016 Major League Soccer season looking to return to the MLS Cup Playoffs after failing to qualify the previous two seasons but instead missed the playoffs for the third consecutive year, a club record, and finished in last place in the Western Conference.

The season covers the period from December 7, 2015 to December 10, 2016, the day of MLS Cup 2016. This was Houston's fifth season at BBVA Compass Stadium, after opening the stadium in 2012.

Club

Coaching staff

Until May 25, 2016

From June 7, 2016 to October 28, 2016

From October 28, 2016

Other information

 Ben Guill Jake Silverstein
|-
||President of Business Operations|| Chris Canetti 
|-

Roster

Transfers 

For transfers in, dates listed are when Houston Dynamo officially signed the players to the roster. Transactions where only the rights to the players are acquired are not listed. For transfers out, dates listed are when Houston Dynamo officially removed the players from its roster, not when they signed with another club. If a player later signed with another club, his new club will be noted, but the date listed here remains the one when he was officially removed from Houston Dynamo roster.

In

Draft picks 

Draft picks are not automatically signed to the team roster. Only those who are signed to a contract will be listed as transfers in. Only trades involving draft picks and executed after the start of 2015 MLS SuperDraft will be listed in the notes.

Out

Friendlies

Desert Diamond Cup

Competitions

Major League Soccer

Conference Table

Matches

Overall table

U.S. Open Cup

Player statistics

Appearances and goals

|-
|colspan="14"|Players eligible from Rio Grande Valley:

|-
|colspan="14"|Players away from the club on loan:

|-
|colspan="14"|Players who left Houston Dynamo during the season:

|}

Goal scorers

Assists

Disciplinary record

See also 
 Houston Dynamo
 2016 in American soccer
 2016 Major League Soccer season

References 

Houston Dynamo FC seasons
Houston Dynamo
Houston Dynamo
Houston Dyamo